The University of Southeastern Philippines (USeP);) is a public, research, coeducational, regional state university based in Davao City, Davao del Sur, Philippines. Founded on December 15, 1978, the university is an integration of four state educational institutions: Mindanao State University-Davao, the University of the Philippines-Master of Management Program in Davao, the Davao School of Arts and Trades, and the Davao National Regional Agricultural School. It was the first state university in Davao Region.

The university has four campuses: Obrero (main) and Mintal campuses in Davao City, Tagum-Mabini Campus which has two units—one in Tagum City in Davao del Norte and one in Mabini in Davao de Oro, and Sto. Tomas External Studies Program Center in Sto. Tomas, Davao del Norte.

History

December 15, 1978 marked the birth of the first ever state university in Region XI. On this date, Batas Pambansa Blg. 12 was passed, thereby creating the University of Southern Philippines, the givers of the university's initial name not knowing that there was already a university of the same name, the University of Southern Philippines in Cebu, to be later renamed as the University of Southeastern Philippines.

The integration of the School of Arts and Trades (DSAT) and the Davao National Regional Agricultural School (DNRAS) paved the way for the birth of the five USeP campuses: the Davao City main campus in Obrero with an area of 6.5 hectares; the Mintal campus, Davao City that has an area of 2.8 hectares; the Tagum campus, Tagum City with a 77-hectare land area; the Mabini campus which lies in a 109-hectare land area in Mampising, Mabini, Davao de Oro Province; and the latest addition, Bislig campus in Bislig, Surigao del Sur with an area of 9.7 hectares.

The early years saw birth of the College of Engineering and Technology in Obrero campus, the College of Forestry and Agriculture at Tagum and Mabini campuses and College of Arts and Sciences in Mintal campus. The succeeding years witnessed developments in the academic and administrative realms of USeP.

In 1993, through a Board of Regents (BOR) resolution, External Studies Programs were established. These were USeP-Hinatuan Ext. Program in Surigao del Sur; USeP-Baganga External Studies Program in Davao Oriental; USeP-Kapalong College of Agricultural Technology and Entrepreneurship and USeP-Pantukan External Studies Program.

In 1996, USeP-Bislig campus in Surigao del Sur was established. PICOP waived nine hectares of Barangay Maharlika, Bislig for the initial campus.

From 1993 to 1997, new units were created. Among them were Mindanao Center for Policy Studies (MCPS); Affiliated Non-Conventional Energy Center (ANEC) for Region XI; Office of Admission and Student Records (OASR); Medical Division; Institute of Urban Finance and Management; University Testing and Guidance Office (UGTO); Project Implementation Unit (PIU); Institute of Computing (IC) and Center for Professministrative and organizational structure of the university to make it more responsive to changing needs and to enable the university to engage more in research and extension. Today, it has a modified organizational structure of the university, which sees the continued implementation of the university's decentralization policies under established policy guidelines, which has resulted to more effective and efficient units. The Evening Program implemented through BOR resolution No. 2732 accommodates students who could not make it in the regular day program with some variation in fees. Also, Summer Program has been approved. By the year 2001, the total number of curriculum offerings was 31 for the Graduate School and 28 for the Undergraduate Program.

Beginning 2002, the Office of the President under the administration of Dr. Julieta I. Ortiz identified and pursued Program Accreditation as one of the major thrusts of the university. The same year, three programs were awarded Level I status by AACCUP. These were BSED of USeP Tagum and Obrero, BEED of Obrero and Forestry and Agricultural Engineering of Tagum. Today, 16 of its undergraduate programs are accredited academic units.

Campuses

USeP's main campus building is located at Bo. Obrero, Bajada District, Davao City. Its provincial campuses are designated as Mintal (Davao City), Tagum-Mabini, and Bislig campuses. Later, they added a Santo Tomas campus situated inside the old STNHS campus called USeP - Sto. Tomas External Studies Program Center.

The Bislig campus later ceased to be a campus of USeP and was turned over to Surigao del Sur State University (now North Eastern Mindanao State University), according to Surigao del Sur Rep. Johnny T. Pimentel.

Rankings

The University of Southeastern Philippines (USeP), a state university in Davao City, was one of the 15 Philippine universities that made it to the 2011 list of top Asian universities done by Quacquarelli Symonds (QS) with a rank of 201+.

In  2012, USeP  Davao  made it  for the first time  to the  251-300 bracket  in the Top 300 Asian Universities list of education and career network Quacquarelli Symonds (QS).

In the 2013 QS rankings released on its official website, USeP is one of the Asian universities that occupied the 251st - 300th ranking. The university ranks top five (5) among other Philippine universities that made it to the list. The Philippine schools that occupied the top four (4) slots are the University of the Philippines at 67th; Ateneo de Manila University at 109th; University of Santo Tomas at 150th; and De La Salle University at 151st- 160th.

USeP's Freedom of Information (FOI) Program

The 1987 Constitution, the supreme and fundamental law of the land, recognizes the right of the people to information on matters of public concern. Pursuant to this mandate, President Rodrigo Roa Duterte signed Executive Order No. 02, Series of 2016 to institutionalize the procedures to strengthen the people's access to government-held data, records, and documents.

As a State University mandated to adopt a policy of transparency and accountability, the University of Southeastern Philippines (USeP) Board of Regents, during its 167th meeting on July 5, 2017, has approved the USeP Freedom of Information Manual through BOR Resolution No. 37, s. 2017.

The FOI Program in the university is being facilitated by the Office of the Secretary of the University and the University Records Office (OSU-URO). Since its implementation in 2017, USeP has been recognized and certified by the PCOO as FOI compliant. This compliance is being triangulated as one of the main criteria for an agency to be granted with Performance-Based Bonus (PBB).

Through FOI, the University Administration provides a process in guiding and assisting all its university officials, faculty, staff, and students, in dealing with requests of information of the general public in compliance to E.O. 02, s. 2016 directives. Moreover, the program not only serve as a proof of the university's commitment towards good governance. It will also assure its clients
and stakeholders of their rights to access information on matters of public concern.

References

http://www.topuniversities.com/university-rankings/asian-university-rankings/2011
http://www.usep.edu.ph/version/image/usep_brochure.pdf
http://www.topuniversities.com/university-rankings/asian-university-rankings/2012
http://www.abs-cbnnews.com/lifestyle/06/13/12/5-ph-schools-asia%E2%80%99s-top-300-universities

State universities and colleges in the Philippines
Philippine Association of State Universities and Colleges
Universities and colleges in Davao City
Research universities in the Philippines